Megalopaussus amplipennis is a species of beetle in the family Carabidae, the only species in the genus Megalopaussus.

References

Paussinae